Sierra Ballena Shear Zone or SBSZ is a sinistral strike-slip shear zone running across the Uruguayan Shield in eastern Uruguay and the Brazilian state of Rio Grande do Sul. The system was last active in the Precambrian.

References 

Seismic faults of South America
Strike-slip faults
Inactive faults
Geology of Brazil
Geology of Uruguay
Precambrian South America
Shear zones